Darreh Rud or Darrehrud may refer to:
 Darreh Rud, Baft, Kerman Province
 Darreh Rud, Jiroft, Kerman Province

See also
 Rud Darreh